Manuel Salvador Salgado Amador (born 2 March 1954) is a Mexican politician from the Ecologist Green Party of Mexico. From 2007 to 2009 he served as Deputy of the LX Legislature of the Mexican Congress representing Sinaloa. He previously served in the Congress of Baja California Sur from 1996 to 1999.

References

1954 births
Living people
Politicians from Baja California Sur
Ecologist Green Party of Mexico politicians
21st-century Mexican politicians
Members of the Congress of Baja California Sur
20th-century Mexican politicians
Deputies of the LX Legislature of Mexico
Members of the Chamber of Deputies (Mexico) for Sinaloa